Ornella Domini (born 2 November 1988) is a Swiss professional boxer. She is a two-time European female welterweight champion, having held the title since 2019 and previously from 2013 to 2015. She also challenged for the WBC female super-welterweight title in 2018. As of September 2020, Domini is ranked as the world's fifth best active female welterweight by The Ring and ninth by BoxRec.

Professional career
Domini made her professional debut on 26 January 2013, scoring a third-round technical knockout (TKO) victory against Daniela Bickei at the Hotel Ramada in Geneva, Switzerland.

Following four more wins, one by TKO, she defeated the European female super-lightweight champion Sabrina Giuliani—who had moved up a weight class to face Domini—via ten-round split decision (SD), capturing the inaugural European female welterweight title on 9 November 2013 at the Hotel Ramada. The two ringside judges scored the bout 96–95 in favour of Domini while the referee scored it 97–94 to Giuliani. After two unanimous decision (UD) victories in non-title bouts in 2014—Kremena Petkova in March and Borislava Goranova in May—Domini defeated Giuliani in a rematch on 28 March 2015, retaining her European title via ten-round UD at the Hotel Ramada with the scorecards reading 100–91, 97–93, and 97–93.

Domini was scheduled to face undisputed female welterweight champion Cecilia Brækhus on 28 November 2015 at the ESPRIT Arena in Düsseldorf, Germany, with Brækhus' WBA, WBC, IBF, and WBO titles on the line. The bout was set to serve on the undercard of Wladimir Klitschko vs. Tyson Fury. However, the bout was called off after Brækhus suffered an injury. Following another postponement of a bout with Brækhus, coupled with commitments outside of boxing, Domini made the decision to retire from the sport.

After two years out of the ring, she made her return on 1 April 2017, defeating Lela Terashvili via six-round UD at the Hotel Ramada. Two months later Domini suffered the first defeat of her career, losing by UD over six rounds against Ruth Chisale on 24 June. She bounced back from defeat with a third round stoppage via corner retirement (RTD) against former opponent Lela Terashvili in November, followed by two UD victories against Mariam Tatunashvili in March and September 2018.

Her next fight came against WBC female super-welterweight champion Ewa Piątkowska on 10 November 2018 at the Gliwice Arena in Gliwice, Poland. In what was described as a dominant performance from the champion, Domini suffered her second professional defeat, losing by UD with the judges' scorecards reading 100–90, 99–91, and 98–92.

Following the loss, she recaptured the vacant European female welterweight title, defeating Szilvia Szabados via ten-round UD on 9 March 2019 at the Hotel Ramada with the scorecards reading 99–91, 98–93, and 97–94. The pair had a rematch one year later on 7 March at the same venue, with Domini retaining her title with a SD victory.

Professional boxing record

References

External links

Living people
1988 births
Swiss boxers
Welterweight boxers
Light-middleweight boxers
European Boxing Union champions